Fasaran (also Romanized as Fasārān and Fesārān; also known as Feysārū and Fīsāru) is a village in Baraan-e Shomali Rural District, in the Central District of Isfahan County, Isfahan Province, Iran. At the 2006 census, its population was 1,560, in 375 families.

References 

Populated places in Isfahan County